77P/Longmore is a periodic comet in the Solar System.

It was discovered by Andrew Jonathan Longmore on a photographic plate taken on 10 June 1975 at the 1.22m Schmidt telescope at Siding Spring Observatory, New South Wales, Australia. Its brightness was estimated at an apparent magnitude of 17. After further observations Brian G. Marsden was able to calculate the perihelion date at 4 November 1975 and the orbital period as 6.98 years.

The next perihelion date was computed to be 21 October 1981. T. Seki of Geisei, Japan relocated the comet on 2 January 1981 with a brightness of magnitude 18. It has since been observed in 1988, 1995, 2002 and 2009.

On 17 October 1963 the comet had passed  from Jupiter.

See also
List of numbered comets

References

External links 
 Orbital simulation from JPL (Java) / Horizons Ephemeris
 77P at Kronk's Cometography

Periodic comets
0077
Comets in 2016
19750610